Roy Anderson, Andersen or Andersson may refer to:

Sports
 Roy Anderson (American football) (born 1980), American football coach
 Roy Anderson (ice hockey) in 1910 NHA season
 Roy Anderson (baseball); see Clyde Engle
 Roy Andersson (footballer) (born 1949), footballer from Sweden
 Roy Andersen (born 1955), runner

Others
 Sir Roy M. Anderson (born 1947), British scientific adviser
 Roy Anderson (The Office), character from television sitcom The Office
 Roy Andersson (born 1943), Swedish film director 
 Roy Andersen (South Africa) (born 1948), South African businessman and military officer
 Roy Anderson (aviation executive); see Navy Supply Corps